Arthur Haddon may refer to:

 Arthur Langan Haddon (1895–1961), New Zealand Church of Christ minister
 Arthur Trevor Haddon (1864–1941), British painter and illustrator